Jalil Jafari (born 1967) is an Iranian politician.

Jafari was born in Kowsar, Ardabil Province. He is a member of the 9th Islamic Consultative Assembly from the electorate of Kowsar and Khalkhal.  Jafari won with 23,745 (40.64%) votes.

References

People from Kivi, Iran
Deputies of Khalkhal and Kowsar
Living people
1967 births
Members of the 9th Islamic Consultative Assembly